Prince Sabahaddin de Neuchâtel (born Sultanzade Mehmed Sabâhaddin Bey; 13 February 1879 – 30 June 1948) was an Ottoman sociologist and thinker. Because of his threat to the ruling House of Osman (the Ottoman dynasty), of which he was a member, in the late 19th and early 20th centuries due to his political activity and push for democracy in the Empire, he was exiled. He was one of the founders of the short-lived Ottoman Liberty Party.

Although part of the ruling Ottoman dynasty himself, through his mother, Sultanzade Sabahaddin was known as a Young Turk and thus opposed to the absolute rule of the dynasty. As a follower of Émile Durkheim, Prince Sabahaddin is considered to be one of the founders of sociology in Turkey. He established the League for Private Initiative and Decentralization in 1902.

Biography

Prince Sabahaddin was born in Istanbul in 1879. His mother was Seniha Sultan, daughter of Ottoman sultan Abdulmejid I and Nalandil Hanım. His father was Mahmud Celaleddin Pasha, the son of Grand Admiral Damat Gürcü Halil Rifat Pasha.

Sultanzade Sabahaddin had a versatile education at the Ottoman palace.

Sabahaddin fled in late 1899 with his brother and father, who had fallen out with Abdul Hamid II, first to Great Britain, then to Geneva, the center of opposition to the Ottoman Sultan. After a warning by the Federal Council in Geneva in 1900, they left the city for Paris and London.

In the first phase of his career in political opposition (1900–1908), he sought unity between Christians and Muslims, and met with leaders from the respective groups. He received support in the cause of the Young Turks. During this time, he met Edmond Demolins and became a follower of the school of social sciences. Sabahaddin advocated liberal economic policies in his , which became a rival to Ahmet Rıza's Committee for Union and Progress (CUP). This division plagued the Young Turk movement before 1908 and would provide the central dispute in the more institutionalized political discourse of the Second constitutional era. After the Young Turk Revolution in 1908 and the seizure of power by the Committee of Union and Progress, Sabahaddin returned to the Ottoman Empire.

His liberal party, standing in opposition to the Committee of Union and Progress, was banned twice, in 1909 and 1913, and he had to flee again. During the first World War I, he spent as head of the opposition in exile in western Switzerland.

In 1919, Sabahaddin returned to Istanbul in the hope of realising his political vision, but was ultimately banned in 1924 by the victorious Turkish National Movement under Mustafa Kemal (later Atatürk). His project of a democratic Turkey contained means of decentralization and private initiative, elements of the social theories of Frederic Le Play and Edmond Demolins. After the establishment of the new Republic of Turkey in 1923, he was exiled from Turkey by a law of 3 March 1924 which expelled all living members of the House of Osman and so, from this time, Sabahaddin had to live in retirement in Switzerland. In his autobiography The Witness (1962, first edition; 1974, revised and enlargened second edition), John G. Bennett notes that in his later years, because of his frustrations, disappointments and exile, he reportedly had become an alcoholic and had died in great poverty.

In 1952, Sultanzade Sabahaddin's remains were transferred to Istanbul and buried in the mausoleum of his father and grandfather.

Family  
Sabahaddin had two wife: 
 Tabinak Hanim (m. 1898 - div. 14 August 1961), with whom he had the only daughter: 
 Fethiye Kendi Sabahaddin Hanim (1899 - 1986). She did not marry or have children. 
 Kamuran Hanım. Tabinak's younger sister, they married after Sabahaddin divorced his first wife.

Influences on other people
Sabahaddin unknowingly influenced many people including John G. Bennett, who was introduced to him by Satvet Lutfi Bey (Satvet Lütfi Tozan) in 1920 while Bennett was working as an intelligence officer for the British Army occupying Istanbul after the First World War. Sabahaddin brought Bennett into the world of spirituality by encouraging him to read Les Grands Initiés ("The Great Initiates") by Édouard Schuré. He had also introduced Bennett to an English woman living in Turkey, Winifred "Polly" Beaumont, whom Bennett later married. Among others to whom Sabahaddin had introduced Bennett, the most influential was G.I. Gurdjieff – a man Bennett regarded as his mentor and master for the rest of his life.

Ancestry

See also
Sultanzade
Young Turk
Seniha Sultan

References

Auteur(e): Hans-Lukas Kieser / EGO

1878 births
1948 deaths
Scientists from the Ottoman Empire
Turkish sociologists
19th-century people from the Ottoman Empire
Georgians from the Ottoman Empire
Burials at Eyüp Cemetery